The Geographische Zeitschrift (English: The Geographical Journal) is a German peer-reviewed academic journal specialising in human geography. It was established in 1895 and is now published by the Franz Steiner Verlag.

Publications established in 1895
Quarterly journals
German-language journals
Geography journals